Praia do Evaristo is a beach within the Municipality of Albufeira, in the Algarve, Portugal. In 2012 Praia do Evaristo has been designated a Blue Flag Beach.

Description
Praia do Evaristo is a small popular beach to the west of the resort town of Albufeira. This well kept beach has blue flag status(2012). The beach has fine golden sand with low indented ochre coloured cliffs to the rear. On the sands there are a number of rocky little nooks and crannies provided by the various rock formations. To the centre back of the beach a seasonal watercourse which runs down to the sea and is completely dry for the majority of the year. The sea is safe and clean and has an average summer seawater temperature of 20-23 °C. The sea water quality classification system on has given this beach a three star rating. The rocky outcrops that clutter the seashore are an ideal environment for those that enjoy snorkelling where the marine life can be seen in abundants.

Car Park 

To the back of the beach there is a car park of which some places there are allocated parking bays for disabled drivers displaying a European blue badge. Parking can prove very difficult during the busy summer months. From the car park there is a boardwalk down to, and along the beach which provides easy access for wheelchair users.

Facilities 

During the summer season the beach is patrolled by lifeguards. There are Loungers, parasols and Pedalo's which can be hired. The beach has good access for the disabled having boardwalks running east and west along the back of the beach from the central car park. There are showers and toilets available at the eastern end of the beach next to the snack bar. There is also a beach restaurant which specialises in fish. Evaristo opened in 1986 replacing the original small shack on the beach. The restaurant has no menu, you simply choose from our selection of fish or shellfish from that day’s fresh catch. The restaurant has become very popular and making a reservation is strongly suggested to avoid disappointment.

Gallery

References

Beaches of Albufeira
Blue Flag beaches of Portugal